Eleven Days, Eleven Nights (also spelled 11 Days, 11 Nights; Italian title: Undici giorni, undici notti) is a 1987 Italian softcore erotic drama film produced, directed and lensed by Joe D'Amato and starring Jessica Moore, Joshua McDonald, and Mary Sellers set and shot in New Orleans.

The film was one of D'Amato's biggest financial successes, selling well in countries around the world.

Plot 
On a boat ride in New Orleans, Michael, a yuppie working in construction, meets writer and libertine Sarah Asproon. For her publisher, Sarah needs to finish an autobiographical book about her 100 erotic conquests and chooses her chance acquaintance Michael as her last and crowning conquest. However, he is about to marry Helen.

Michael and Sarah strike an erotic pact for 11 days and 11 nights and live through a number sexual adventures with each other. After a while, Helen becomes suspicious and starts following them.

At the end of the time, Sarah has fallen in love with Michael. When she reveals to Michael her initial scheme of using him for her book, however, he takes her forcefully from behind and leaves her for his future wife.

Cast 
Jessica Moore as Sarah Asproon
Joshua Mc Donald as Michael
Mary Sellers as Michael's betrothed
Tom Mojack as Dan
David Brandon as Peter
John Morghen as Brett
Laura Gemser as Sarah's publisher
Antonio Bonifacio

Production 
The film was shot for the most part on location in New Orleans. Some of the interiors were shot in Rome.

Release 
In Italy, the film was released on DVD under the title Eleven Days Eleven Nights in CG Entertainment's "cinekult" series; it contains the Italian dubbing in a declaredly uncut version, including Italian subtitles for the deaf or hard-of-hearing.

Reception 
Clive Davies called the film a "[p]retty terrible and unerotic 9 1/2 weeks cash-in"; however, he enjoyed it more than its big-budgeted model.

Bibliography 

 
 

Video source:

References

External links
 
 Eleven Days, Eleven Nights at Variety Distribution

1986 films
Films directed by Joe D'Amato
Italian erotic drama films
Films set in the United States
1980s erotic drama films
1986 drama films
1980s Italian films